The Materials Research Society (MRS) is a non-profit, professional organization for materials researchers, scientists and engineers. Established in 1973, MRS is a member-driven organization of approximately 14,000 materials researchers from academia, industry and government.

Headquartered in Warrendale, Pennsylvania, MRS membership spans over 90 countries, with approximately 48% of MRS members residing outside the United States.

MRS members work in all areas of materials science and research, including physics, chemistry, biology, mathematics and engineering.  MRS provides a collaborative environment for idea exchange across all disciplines of materials science through its meetings, publications and other programs designed to foster networking and cooperation.

The Society’s mission is to promote communication for the advancement of interdisciplinary materials research to improve the quality of life.

Governance 
MRS is governed by a Board of Directors which is composed of the Society's officers and 12 to 21 Directors, the exact number determined by resolution of the Board.  Directors are elected by the membership.  Up to 25% of the Directors, however, may be appointed by the Board MRS Officers include a President, Vice President, Secretary, Treasurer, and Immediate Past President.

Meetings 
MRS hosts two annual meetings for its members and the materials community to network, exchange technical information, and contribute to the advancement of research. These meetings are held in Boston, Massachusetts, every fall, and in different cities (on the west coast) every spring.  Each meeting incorporates more than 50 technical symposia as well as many “broader impact” sessions that include professional development, government policies and funding opportunities, student activities, award talks and special events.  Each of these meetings is attended by approximately 5,000-6,000 materials scientists, researchers and engineers.

MRS also partners with other materials organizations to develop meetings such as the International Materials Research Congress (IMRC), held annually in Cancun, Mexico.

In addition, MRS offers meeting expertise and logistical/operational infrastructure to other scientific communities in need of conference support via the Conference Services Program.

Publications 
In partnership with Springer Nature, MRS publishes the following periodicals for the materials community:
 MRS Bulletin
 Journal of Materials Research
 MRS Communications
 MRS Energy & Sustainability
 MRS Advances

Through the MRS Publishing program, MRS publishes materials-related monographs, handbooks and textbooks, including:
 Introduction to Quantum Computing by Ray LaPierre (First in The Materials Research Society Series in collaboration with Springer Nature)
 Imperfections in Crystalline Solids by Wei Cai and William D. Nix (First textbook in the new MRS-Cambridge Materials Fundamentals Series)
 Liquid Cell Electron Microscopy edited by Frances M. Ross
 Structural DNA Nanotechnology, 2016 PROSE Award Winner for Biological Science, by Nadrian C. Seeman
 Modern Techniques of Surface Science, Third Edition by D. Phil Woodruff

Advocacy and policy 
MRS, through its Government Affairs Committee, advocates for sustainable funding of science, provides forums for public-policy discussions, offers itself as a scientific resource for policymakers, and delivers timely information on emerging public policy issues, federal programs and other activities of importance to its members and the materials community. 
MRS advocacy efforts include:
 Materials Voice—A program that sends letters to Congress about issues in materials science.
 Intersections Newsletter—A publication that discusses the intersection of material research and government, including what’s happening in Washington, D.C. and with the government affairs activities of MRS. 
 MRS Congressional Science and Engineering Fellowships—Fellows serve a one-year term working as a special legislative assistant on the staff of U.S. congressional offices or committees in Washington, D.C.

Materials Research Society Foundation 
The Materials Research Society Foundation was founded in 2012 to support the MRS mission and to ensure and enrich MRS’s education, outreach and peer-recognition programs. Foundation programs include:
 Awards—MRS presents awards for outstanding contributions to the progress of materials research each year during its Spring and Fall Meetings. The MRS Awards Program includes:
 MRS Fellow
 Von Hippel Award
 David Turnbull Lectureship
 Innovation in Materials Characterization Award
 Mid-Career Research Award
 Materials Theory Award
 MRS Medal
 Outstanding Young Investigator Award
 Kavli Foundation Early Career Lectureship in Materials Science
 MRS Postdoctoral Awards
 MRS Graduate Student Awards
 Arthur Nowick Graduate Student Award
 MRS Impact Award
MRS Nelson "Buck" Robinson Science and Technology Award for Renewable Energy
MRS Woody White Service Award

 Broadening Participation in Materials Science—promotes diversity and inclusion within the broad professional community
 Focus on Sustainability—highlights the Society’s sustainability science activities, including publications, special events, social media and symposia
 Impact of Materials on Society (IMOS)—an introductory course that delves into how engineering shapes, and is shaped by, social and cultural variables, and illustrates how a career in engineering is not only about math and science, but also about social problem-solving
 Professional Development—workshops and seminars held at MRS Spring and Fall Meetings that encourage and enhance professional communication and leadership skills
 Strange Matter—an interactive traveling science exhibit with over a dozen hands-on experiences developed by MRS, the National Science Foundation and the Ontario Science Centre
 MRS University Chapter Program—fosters an environment for interdisciplinary collaboration, professional growth, education outreach and leadership development

References

External links 
 Materials Research Society
 Materials Research Society Foundation

Materials science organizations
Scientific societies based in the United States